Uzunlar is a village in the District of Manavgat, Antalya Province, Turkey. As of 2010 it had a population of 493.

References

Villages in Manavgat District